The 1924 United States presidential election in West Virginia took place on November 4, 1924, as part of the 1924 United States presidential election which was held throughout all contemporary 48 states. Voters chose eight representatives, or electors to the Electoral College, who voted for president and vice president. 

West Virginia voted for the Republican nominee, incumbent President Calvin Coolidge of Massachusetts, over the Democratic nominee and West Virginia native, Ambassador John W. Davis. Coolidge ran with former Budget Director Charles G. Dawes of Illinois, while Davis ran with Governor Charles W. Bryan of Nebraska. Also in the running that year was the Progressive Party nominee, Senator Robert M. La Follette of Wisconsin and his running mate Senator Burton K. Wheeler of Montana. 

Coolidge won the state by a margin of 5.38 percent.

Results

Results by county

Notes

References 

West Virginia
1924
1924 West Virginia elections